Aaron Shattock (born 2 May 1980) is a premiership-winning Australian rules footballer who played with the Brisbane Lions and Port Adelaide in the Australian Football League (AFL).

AFL career

Brisbane Lions (2000–2004)
A midfielder, Shattock was recruited to Brisbane from Woodville-West Torrens and made his debut in 2000. His highlight of his career was starting on the interchange bench in Brisbane's 2002 AFL Grand Final win over Collingwood and remained with the club until the end of the 2004 season.

Port Adelaide (2005–2006)
In 2005 and 2006 he played with Port Adelaide. He was delisted at the end of 2006 season.

QAFL career
Shattock served as the captain of Labrador in the Queensland Australian Football League (QAFL).

Statistics

|-
|- style="background-color: #EAEAEA"
! scope="row" style="text-align:center" | 2000
|style="text-align:center;"|
| 34 || 9 || 0 || 0 || 36 || 32 || 68 || 15 || 9 || 0.0 || 0.0 || 4.0 || 3.6 || 7.6 || 1.7 || 1.0 || 0
|-
! scope="row" style="text-align:center" | 2001
|style="text-align:center;"|
| 34 || 6 || 0 || 0 || 30 || 18 || 48 || 16 || 3 || 0.0 || 0.0 || 5.0 || 3.0 || 8.0 || 2.7 || 0.5 || 0
|- style="background-color: #EAEAEA"
! scope="row" style="text-align:center;" | 2002
|style="text-align:center;"|
| 34 || 17 || 7 || 5 || 92 || 46 || 138 || 42 || 19 || 0.4 || 0.3 || 5.4 || 2.7 || 8.1 || 2.5 || 1.1 || 0
|-
! scope="row" style="text-align:center" | 2003
|style="text-align:center;"|
| 34 || 18 || 7 || 1 || 103 || 66 || 169 || 55 || 29 || 0.4 || 0.1 || 5.7 || 3.7 || 9.4 || 3.1 || 1.6 || 0
|- style="background-color: #EAEAEA"
! scope="row" style="text-align:center" | 2004
|style="text-align:center;"|
| 34 || 7 || 1 || 1 || 45 || 23 || 68 || 25 || 7 || 0.1 || 0.1 || 6.4 || 3.3 || 9.7 || 3.6 || 1.0 || 0
|-
! scope="row" style="text-align:center" | 2005
|style="text-align:center;"|
| 12 || 10 || 1 || 0 || 67 || 64 || 131 || 38 || 12 || 0.1 || 0.0 || 6.7 || 6.4 || 13.1 || 3.8 || 1.2 || 0
|- style="background-color: #EAEAEA"
! scope="row" style="text-align:center" | 2006
|style="text-align:center;"|
| 12 || 1 || 0 || 0 || 13 || 5 || 18 || 8 || 2 || 0.0 || 0.0 || 13.0 || 5.0 || 18.0 || 8.0 || 2.0 || 0
|- class="sortbottom"
! colspan=3| Career
! 68
! 16
! 7
! 386
! 254
! 640
! 199
! 81
! 0.2
! 0.1
! 5.7
! 3.7
! 9.4
! 2.9
! 1.2
! 0
|}

References

External links

1980 births
Living people
Port Adelaide Football Club players
Port Adelaide Football Club players (all competitions)
Brisbane Lions players
Brisbane Lions Premiership players
Woodville-West Torrens Football Club players
Australian rules footballers from South Australia
Labrador Australian Football Club players
People educated at Sacred Heart College, Adelaide
One-time VFL/AFL Premiership players